Dragan Bjelogrlić "Bjela" (born 10 October 1963) is a Serbian actor, director and producer.

Career
Bjelogrlić made his acting debut as a 15-year old, playing Sava Jovanović Sirogojno in Boško Buha, a 1978 film that achieved sizable popularity.

He followed that up in the coming years with other roles in TV series, short, and feature films. By the mid-1980s, Bjelogrlić was an established young actor in SFR Yugoslavia. In 1985 he appeared in Bal na vodi as part of an ensemble cast featuring Srđan Todorović, Nebojša Bakočević, Goran Radaković, and Gala Videnović.

In 1987, he became one of the central cast members on the hugely popular drama television series Bolji život, playing the role of Boba Popadić. His brother Goran Bjelogrlić is a film producer. His 2010 film, Montevideo, God Bless You!, was selected as the Serbian entry for the Best Foreign Language Film at the 84th Academy Awards, but did not make the final shortlist. The film's sequel, See You in Montevideo, was released in 2014.

Awards and recognition
 Best acting couple (with Vesna Trivalić) at the festival in Niš for the series Bolji život 1991.
 Two grand prizes "Ćele-kula" for the best actor in the film Lepa sela lepo gore at the acting festival in Niš
 Two Golden Mimosas, for best acting role in the film Lepa sela lepo gore]at the Herceg Novi Film Festival
 Statue of Liberty for the best acting achievement at Sopot Film Festival
 Charter Award for Outstanding Male Role in Doktor Rej i đavoli
 Golden Antenna for the best screenplay for Montevideo, God Bless You!
 Audience Award in Moscow for the film See You in Montevideo
 Award for contribution to European cinematography at the 10th European and Mediterranean Film Festival in Piran (2020)

Selected filmography

Film

Television

See also 
Cinema of Serbia

References

External links
 

1963 births
Living people
People from Opovo
Serbian male actors
Serbian male child actors
Serbian film producers
Serbian film directors